Shery (born August 18, 1985) is a Guatemalan Latin pop singer and songwriter. She has recorded songs in Spanish and Italian, and shared stage with such international superstars as Chayanne, Cristian Castro, Manuel Mijares, Miguel Bosé, Enrique Iglesias, Vikki Carr and Aleks Syntek. Two of her original compositions (namely "El amor es un fantasma" and "En la vida y para siempre") have been finalists in the John Lennon Songwriting Contest, in New York City.

"El amor es un fantasma" ("Love is a Ghost"), her first album, was released in January 2008 after two and a half years of production. The CD is named after the first song ever written by the artist, which debuted in radio with 26 straight weeks in the Top 40 in her natal Guatemala in 2005.

The album features 11 original songs written by Shery, a song written by legendary Spanish songwriter José Luis Perales, as well as duets with Italian producer / songwriter Francesco Sondelli, Guatemalan singer Jorge "El Bardo" and another with Cuban-American vocalist Daniel René, former member of Latin Pop band Menudo / MDO. The album includes a track mixed by Eddie Kramer, who has produced for Led Zeppelin, Jimi Hendrix, Kiss, The Rolling Stones, Joe Cocker and David Bowie.

In 2011 she released "Uno solo en este juego", a pop/rock song featuring el Bardo. The official videoclip, which features a real racing car and 3D animation effects, was directed by Jimmy Lemus and Leonel Álvarez.

Videoclips
2011: Me converti en roca
2011: Uno solo en este juego
2006: Libre

Number 1 National Radio Hits (Guatemala)
2011: Uno solo en este juego
2008: En la vida y para siempre
2007: El Amor (duet with Daniel René)
2006: Me converti en roca
2006: Todo se termina aqui
2005: El amor es un fantasma

Discography

Singles

2011: Me converti en roca
 Me converti en roca (electro-pop)
 Me converti en roca (banda)
 Me converti en roca (ballad)
 Me converti en roca (instrumental / karaoke)
 El sol esperara
2011: Uno solo en este juego
 Uno solo en este juego (feat. el Bardo)
 Uno solo en este juego (solo version)
 Uno solo en este juego (Rafa midnight mix)
 Uno solo en este juego (Instrumental / sing along track)
2008: En la vida y para siempre
 En la vida y para siempre (radio cut)
 En la vida y para siempre (album version)
2007: El amor
 El amor (duet with Daniel René)
 Todo se termina aqui
2006: Me converti en roca
 Me converti en roca
 Me converti en roca (extended version)
2005: El amor es un fantasma (single/sencillo)
 El amor es un fantasma
 Libre

Albums
2008: El amor es un fantasma
En la vida y para siempre
Nos desgarramos el alma
Muerteamor
Cuatro paredes
El amor (duet with Daniel René)
Uno solo en este juego (duet with "El Bardo")
Me convertí en roca
El amor es un fantasma
Continuamente (duet with Francesco Sondelli)
Libre
Mis lágrimas
Todo se termina aquí
El suspiro se me va (feat. Francesco Sondelli)

Notes

References

External links
Official Site
Facebook Artist Page
YouTube Official Artist Channel
Hi5 Official Artist Profile
Reverbnation Artist Page
CDBaby Artist Page
PayPlay Artist Page
Amazon.com Album Page
Last.fm Artist Page
Artist Interview with ZonaBonita.com

Living people
1975 births
People from Guatemala City
Women rock singers
Italian-language singers
Rock en Español musicians
Guatemalan women singer-songwriters
21st-century women singers